Leger or Léger may refer to:

People 

 Léger (surname), a list of people with the surname Léger or Leger
 Leodegar or Leger (615-679), Chalcedonian saint, martyr and Bishop of Autun
 Leger Djime (born 1987), Chadian footballer
 Leger Douzable (born 1986), National Football League player

Other uses 

 Leger, Edmonton, Canada, a city neighbourhood
 Hotel Léger, one of the oldest hotels in California
 St. Leger Stakes, one of the five "Classic" British horse races, often referred to as "the Leger"
 Léger (company), a Canadian opinion polling and market research firm
 Leger Holidays, British escorted coach company

See also 
 Ledger (disambiguation)
 Ləgər (disambiguation)